is a Japanese violinist, and the founder and artistic director of the Eminence Symphony Orchestra in Sydney, Australia. He was educated at The Scots College in Bellevue Hill. He is currently the CEO of Creative Intelligence Arts.

Career
Yura is the founder of the Eminence Symphony Orchestra and the Eminence Audio Production company, and a violin virtuoso. He has extensive solo experience ranging from recitals to solo concerto performances. He has played for heads of state, international delegates and officials such as Prime Minister Junichiro Koizumi, and ambassadors and consulate generals to many nations.

Yura has performed with exalted and revered musicians such as Prof. Chikashi Tanaka (violin), Maestro John Harding (violin), Alexey Yemstov (piano), Alexander Gavriluk (piano), and has had a wealth of experiences with top composers around the globe.
Hiroaki Yura has performed as a soloist with most of the major Chinese Orchestras including the Shanghai Symphony Orchestra, Hangzhou Symphony Orchestra, and Guangzhou Symphony Orchestra. He has also performed with the Nanjing Symphony Orchestra, Sydney Youth Orchestra, Woollahra Symphony Orchestra, and debuted in Japan with the Japan Philharmonic Orchestra.

Yura has won numerous competitions internationally and locally, including the 7th Etoh Toshiya International Violin Competition for Young Violinists, was a prize winner at the Gisbourne International Music Competition in New Zealand, received multiple scholarships to study at the Sydney Conservatorium of Music, and has received scholarships with a number of other institutions.

Yura has been critically acclaimed by many leading artists such as Pinchas Zukerman, Salvatore Accardo, and Wanda Wilkomirska.

He has directed orchestral recordings for a number of films and interactive entertainment. Amongst his notable credits are Diablo III, Soulcalibur IV, The Disappearance of Haruhi Suzumiya, and The Tower of Druaga: The Aegis of Uruk.

Yura later founded his own company, Creative Intelligence Arts, which in 2013 announced its first video game project, titled Project Phoenix. In addition, it was announced that Yura would be the project producer for the Under the Dog anime project planned for a 2015 release.

Kickstarter projects
In 2013, Yura launched a Kickstarter project named Project Phoenix through his new company CIA, Inc. and collected $1,014,600 thanks to 15,802 backers. Project Phoenix had a rough estimated release date of 2018 but has still never been made.

In September 2016, through another new company called Area 35, Inc., he started a new Kickstarter project by the name of Tiny Metal, which gathered 1,276 backers but did not reach its funding goal of $50,000. But somehow the game was still made, while Project Phoenix backers have already waited 3 years at this point for their game to be made. His involvement in the Tiny Metal game was never stated in the Kickstarter campaign, only known after the game was produced.

In November 2017, Hiroaki Yura was accused by Tariq Lacy of using funds raised from the Kickstarter of Project Phoenix to develop and fund Tiny Metal. Later, Lacy admitted that his claims and accusations against Yura were false.

Personal life
Hiroaki Yura is married to Mizuki Yura, with whom he has three sons.

References

External links

1981 births
Living people
Japanese violinists
Sydney Conservatorium of Music alumni
People educated at Scots College (Sydney)
21st-century violinists